Barnabas Gooch or Goche or Gough (died c. 1626) was an English lawyer and academic who was Vice-Chancellor of the University of Cambridge from 1611 to 1612. He was also a politician who sat in the House of Commons from 1621 to 1624.

Gooch was born at Alvingham, Lincolnshire, the son of Barnabe Googe, poet and scholar. He matriculated from Magdalene College, Cambridge in Autumn 1582 and was awarded BA in 1587, MA in 1590 and LLD in 1604. He became Master of Magdalene in 1604 and held the post until his death in 1626. In 1605 he was incorporated at Oxford University. He was Vice-Chancellor of Cambridge University from 1611 to 1612 He was admitted as an advocate on  4 February 1613. From 1615 to 1625 he was Commissary of the University.

In 1621, Gooch was elected Member of Parliament for Cambridge University and for  Truro and chose to sit for the university. He was re-elected MP for Cambridge University in 1624. He was Chancellor of Worcester  and Exeter. He was a benefactor to Magdalene College.

Gooch died at Exeter in about 1626.

References

Year of birth missing
1620s deaths
Members of the pre-1707 English Parliament for constituencies in Cornwall
Year of death uncertain
People from East Lindsey District
Vice-Chancellors of the University of Cambridge
Members of the pre-1707 Parliament of England for the University of Cambridge
English MPs 1621–1622
English MPs 1624–1625
Alumni of Magdalene College, Cambridge
Masters of Magdalene College, Cambridge